, there were about 25,000 electric vehicles registered in Connecticut. About 25% of vehicles registered in the state between July and December 2021 were electric.

Government policy
, the state government offers tax rebates of up to $4,250 for purchases of electric vehicles.

Charging stations
, the state government offers tax rebates of $500 for home installations of AC level 2 charging stations.

The Infrastructure Investment and Jobs Act, signed into law in November 2021, allocates  to charging stations in Connecticut.

By region

Bridgeport
, there were about 1,300 electric vehicles registered in Greenwich, 1,000 in Stamford, and 900 in Westport.

References

Connecticut
Road transportation in Connecticut